Daayen Ya Baayen is a Hindi drama film, directed by Bela Negi and produced by Sunil Doshi. The film released on 29 October 2010 under the Alliance Media & Entertainment Pvt. Ltd. banner. The film revolves around the life of Ramesh Majila, a schoolteacher in a remote hilly village, who happens to win a luxury car that takes him on an unexpected journey.

Plot
After returning from Mumbai to Kanda in Uttarakhand, Ramesh Majila (Deepak Dobriyal), who lives a poor lifestyle with his mother; wife Hema; son Baju; and sister-in-law Deepa, takes on the job of a school-teacher in a building which is over-run by mice. He decides to canvas the village folk into building a Kala Kendra while his friend, Basant, enters his name in a draw to win a car. To their surprise, he is indeed awarded the car – making him the only one to own one in the entire village – much to the chagrin of local contractor Jwar Singh. Ramesh quickly learns how to drive, however he soon finds out that the car needs maintenance, especially when it gets damaged, and a mechanic has to be called from out of town. He finds out that Basant has borrowed money to repair the car; while Jwar asks him to drive the car at a competition to pay off the debt. Ramesh agrees, but changes his mind at the last moment. His car was then taken over by Jwar's goons for losses incurred, but Sundar and Basant assist Ramesh in locating its whereabouts. The car gets stolen and an enraged Jwar Singh accuses Ramesh of stealing the car and asks him to re-pay the debt, leaving him to ponder who would have stolen the car from Jwar's property.

Cast
 Deepak Dobriyal as Ramesh Majila
 Manav Kaul as Sundar
 Badrul Islam as Basant
 Bharti Bhatt as Hema R. Majila
 Pratyush Sharma as Baju R. Majila
 Girish Tiwari as School Principal
 Jeetendra Bisht as Jwar Singh
 Dhanuli Devi as Mrs. Majila / Amma
 Aarti Dhami as Deepa
 Dhananjay Shah as Hema's brother
 Aditi Beri as Meena
 Dilawar Karki as Jwar's Croon
 Manoj pathak as Junior artist

References

External links
 Daayen Ya Baayen at Bollywood Hungama
 

2010s Hindi-language films